Sally-Anne Russell is an Australian opera singer. Russell is a mezzo-soprano and has performed nationally and in the USA, Britain and New Zealand.

Together with Sara Macliver, Russell earned nominations for the 2004 and 2005 ARIA Awards for Best Classical Album for their albums Bach Arias and Duets and Baroque Duets.

Russell and Mario Dobernig are co-artistic directors of the Albury Chamber Music Festival, and is also a member of the Kathaumixw Festival International Artistic Council in Powell River, British Columbia, Canada, and the Belvedere International Singing Competition, Vienna.

Discography

Albums

Awards and nominations

ARIA Music Awards
The ARIA Music Awards is an annual awards ceremony that recognises excellence, innovation, and achievement across all genres of Australian music. They commenced in 1987. 

! 
|-
| 2004
| Bach Arias and Duets (with Sara Macliver)
|rowspan="2" | Best Classical Album
| 
|rowspan="2" | 
|-
| 2005
| Baroque Duets (with Sara Macliver)
| 
|-

References

External links 
 Profile, artsmanagement.com.au
 Profile, bach-cantatas.com

Living people
Operatic mezzo-sopranos
21st-century Australian women opera singers
Year of birth missing (living people)
Place of birth missing (living people)